Rovshan Shahmuradov (born 11 May 1999) is an Azerbaijani footballer who plays as a midfielder for Shamakhi in the Azerbaijan Premier League.

Club career
On 2 October 2022, Shahmuradov made his debut in the Azerbaijan Premier League for Shamakhi match against Sabah.

References

External links
 

1999 births
Living people
Association football midfielders
Azerbaijani footballers
Azerbaijan Premier League players
Shamakhi FK players